Matías Damián Muñoz (born 22 March 1996) is an Argentine professional footballer who plays as a centre-back for All Boys.

Career
Muñoz played for the youth set-ups of Boxing Club and Racing Club. His senior career started with Ferro Carril Oeste, making his debut during a 3–1 victory over All Boys on 19 December 2016 in Primera B Nacional. His only other appearance in 2016–17 came against the same opponents in the succeeding July, in a fixture which saw the defender receive his first career red card; he was sent off again in 2017–18 versus Independiente Rivadavia. In November 2018, Muñoz joined Colegiales of Primera B Metropolitana on loan. He scored his first goal during his fourth game away to Deportivo Español on 4 December.

Muñoz returned to Ferro for 2019–20, a campaign that would see him appear just once for the club. In October 2020, Muñoz was loaned back to Primera B Metropolitana with Tristán Suárez.

In January 2022, Muñoz joined Primera Nacional side All Boys.

Career statistics
.

References

External links

1996 births
Living people
People from Río Gallegos, Santa Cruz
Argentine footballers
Association football defenders
Primera Nacional players
Primera B Metropolitana players
Ferro Carril Oeste footballers
Club Atlético Colegiales (Argentina) players
CSyD Tristán Suárez footballers
All Boys footballers